Maria Virginia Pascual (May 22, 1958) is a Spanish pediatric rheumatologist.

Early life and education
Pascual was born on May 22, 1958, in Madrid, Spain but grew up in Ceuta. She earned her undergraduate degree from Centro de Estudios Universitarios in 1975 and her medical degree from the Complutense University of Madrid in 1981.

Career
Pascual moved to the United States in 1987 to complete her postdoctoral fellowship in the Department of Microbiology at the University of Texas Southwestern Medical Center (UTSWMC). She remained at the institution as an assistant professor of pediatrics and an assistant investigator at the Baylor Institute for Immunology Research. In 2001, her research team linked abnormal secretion of alpha interferon to the malfunctioning immune systems of young patients with lupus.

As a pediatric rheumatologist, Pascual investigated pediatric inflammatory and autoimmune diseases with the goal of translating laboratory findings into therapeutic targets and useful biomarkers. In March 2016, she served as the principal investigator of a study that could improve drug development for systemic lupus erythematosus patients. Pascual's research team demonstrated that a drug developed to treat adults could halt inflammation and stop disease progression in a majority of children. The following year, she was appointed the founding Gale and Ira Drukier Director of the Gale and Ira Drukier Institute for Children’s Health at the Weill Cornell Graduate School of Medical Sciences. Pascual was also the recipient of the 2017 Lupus Insight Prize from the Federation of Clinical Immunology Societies in recognition of her "major, novel insight and/or discovery with the promise of changing thinking about lupus as well as a high likelihood of generating further advances in the diagnosis and treatment of the disease."

In August 2018, Pascual was inducted into the Association of American Physicians as a "physician-scientists who has demonstrated excellence in the pursuit of medical knowledge and in the advancement of basic and clinical science discoveries and their application to clinical medicine." A few months later, her research team released a study suggesting that a previously unknown type of T lymphocyte causes the immune system to attack healthy tissues and organs and leads to chronic inflammation. In 2019, Pascual was appointed the Medical and Scientific advisor of biotechnical company Neovacs S.A.

During the COVID-19 pandemic, Pascual was recognized with the Distinguished Basic/Translational Investigator Award from the American College of Rheumatology. She also received a grant supplement from the National Institute of Allergy and Infectious Diseases to study the differences in immune responses in children infected with SARS-CoV-2.

References

External links

Living people
People from Madrid
1958 births
Spanish women physicians
Spanish pediatricians
American rheumatologists
Weill Medical College of Cornell University faculty
University of Texas Southwestern Medical Center faculty